Ragnar "Raggie" Sundquist (May 7, 1892 – November 10, 1951) was a popular Swedish accordionist and composer in the first half of the 1900s. He was born and died in Stockholm.

Sundquist not only performed for audiences in Sweden but toured the United States on three occasions: 1912–13, 1916–20 and 1923–26. He had booked passage on the Titanics maiden voyage in 1912, but his mother persuaded him to take a later boat. Starting in the late 1920s, Sundquist appeared on a long-running Swedish radio program with accordionist Sven Hylén.

Ragnar Sundquist was a prolific recording artist with over 400 releases on Swedish and American labels. He made dozens of recordings for Columbia and Victor Records during his lengthy stays in the United States. His American records featured Sundquist in duets with the Swedish-born accordionists: Eric Berg, Arvid Franzen and Eric Olson. He also went on American tours with Berg  and Franzen. Two of his best-known songs were Bågskytten (The archer) and Lekande steg (Playful steps).

Sundquist launched a number of business ventures.  They included a music store, publishing house and record label. He even owned an accordion factory, where he produced his own model: the "Raggie Special". He was an innovator in Swedish accordion music, who introduced the "bellows shake" technique to Sweden. He also popularized the Italian-American style of playing that he had personally learned from Pietro Frosini while in America.

Ragnar Sundquist is buried in Stockholm's Skogskyrkogården. In the early 1970s Sveriges Dragspelares Riksförbund (The Swedish Accordionists Association) raised money for a tomb that was erected at his grave site.

In 2011 the Library of Congress opened its National Jukebox website with streaming audio for eighteen recordings by 
Ragnar Sundquist.

References

External links

Historic American Newspapers
Ragnar Sundquist
Image files
Ragnar Sundquist
Photo inscribed by Pietro Frosini to Arvid Franzen
Discographies
Ragnar Sundquist on Victor Records.
Eric Berg on Victor Records.
Arvid Franzen on Victor Records.
Pietro Frosini on Victor Records.
Eric Olson on Victor Records.
Swedish music and film
Ragnar Sundquist
Eric Berg
Arvid Franzen
Eric Olson (Olzen)
Streaming audio at the National Jukebox
Ragnar Sundquist
Eric Berg
Arvid Franzen
Pietro Frosini
Streaming audio at the Internet Archive
Ragnar Sundquist
Scandinavian old-time
Videos
Gräsänklingen played by Ragnar Sundquist and Sven Hylén
Lill-Jans polka played by Ragnar Sundquist and Lasse Benny
Kiruna hambo played by Ragnar Sundquist's Quintet

American accordionists
Columbia Records artists
Musicians from Stockholm
Swedish accordionists
Victor Records artists
1892 births
1951 deaths
20th-century American musicians
20th-century accordionists